Ricky Lynn Bell (April 8, 1955 – November 28, 1984) was an American professional football player who was a running back for the Tampa Bay Buccaneers and San Diego Chargers of the National Football League (NFL). Bell was a star in college for the University of Southern California, gaining 1,875 yards rushing in his junior season. The #1 Overall Selection in the 1977 NFL Draft, Bell was inducted posthumously into the College Football Hall of Fame in 2004.

Early years
Born in Houston, Texas, Bell moved to Los Angeles at age eleven and starred in football at its John C. Fremont High School.

Bell was the brother of Archie Bell, lead singer of the 1960s R & B group Archie Bell and the Drells and Jerry Bell, lead singer of the 1970s and 80s funk bands The Dazz Band and The New Birth. He was also the brother of Neekeita and Lamesia Bell.

College career
Originally a linebacker, Bell first attracted notice during his sophomore season at USC in 1974 as a great blocker and between-the-tackles runner, sharing the position of fullback with David Farmer for the  national championship team (UPI) that defeated third-ranked Ohio State 18–17 in the Rose Bowl on New Year's Day.

In 1975, the Trojans won their first seven games. Without a passing game to balance the offense, they struggled to an 8–4 record, but was capped with a victory over Texas A&M in the Liberty Bowl. During this season, Bell led the nation in rushing, gaining 1,875 yards, as he finished third in the voting for the Heisman Trophy and was a consensus All-American.

Then in his senior season of 1976, Bell led the Trojans team to an 11–1 record, crowned by a 14–6 victory over the Michigan Wolverines in the Rose Bowl. Despite suffering nagging injuries that limited his playing time, Bell set the USC single-game rushing record of 347 yards against Washington State at the new Kingdome, and he was the runner-up for the Heisman, behind Tony Dorsett of Pittsburgh, the national champions.

Bell was voted the player of the year in the Pacific-8 Conference in 1976. He was also awarded the 1976 W.J. Voit Memorial Trophy as the outstanding football player on the Pacific Coast and was again a consensus All-American.

NFL career

Bell was the first overall draft choice in the 1977 NFL Draft, selected by the Tampa Bay Buccaneers, who were winless in their first season in 1976. Bell signed a five-year contract for a reported $1.2 million,  by far the richest contract ever signed by an NFL rookie. This draft choice  was somewhat controversial because Tony Dorsett was being projected as an arguably better back than Bell. Bell's selection was not a surprise, however, because Tampa Bay was coached by John McKay, Bell's former head coach at USC through 1975. After a couple mediocre seasons, in 1979, Bell enjoyed his finest season, rushing for 1,263 yards and leading the Buccaneers to the championship of the NFC Central Division. He led the Buccaneers to their first playoff win in franchise history that season by rushing for 142 yards on 38 carries scoring two touchdowns against the Philadelphia Eagles. The team fell one game short of a trip to Super Bowl XIV, ending their season by losing to the Los Angeles Rams for the NFC championship.

In March 1982, McKay sent him to the San Diego Chargers, but suffering from weight loss, aching muscles, and severe skin problems, he retired before the 1983 season.

Death
Bell died at age 29 of heart failure caused by dermatomyositis. Mario Van Peebles portrayed the player in the 1991 made-for-television movie, A Triumph of the Heart: The Ricky Bell Story, which was based on the life of Ricky Bell. Bell's remains were interred in the Inglewood Park Cemetery in Inglewood, California.

He was survived by his wife, Natalia; his 10-year-old son, Ricky, Jr., a 3-year-old daughter, Noell, and his mother, Ruth, brothers Archie Bell, Lee Bell and Jerry Bell.

Honors
Bell was elected to the College Football Hall of Fame in 2004.

See also
 List of college football yearly rushing leaders

References

External links
 
 Sports Reference - college football - Ricky Bell

 

1955 births
1984 deaths
All-American college football players
American football running backs
Burials at Inglewood Park Cemetery
College Football Hall of Fame inductees
National Football League first-overall draft picks
San Diego Chargers players
Players of American football from Houston
Tampa Bay Buccaneers players
USC Trojans football players
John C. Fremont High School alumni
Deaths from autoimmune disease